Cat on a Hot Tin Roof is a three-act play written by Tennessee Williams. The play, an adaptation of his 1952 short story "Three Players of a Summer Game", was written between 1953 and 1955. One of Williams's more famous works and his personal favorite, the play won the Pulitzer Prize for Drama in 1955. Set in the "plantation home in the Mississippi Delta" of Big Daddy Pollitt, a wealthy cotton tycoon, the play examines the relationships among members of Big Daddy's family, primarily between his son Brick and Maggie the "Cat", Brick's wife.

Cat on a Hot Tin Roof features motifs such as social mores, greed, superficiality, mendacity, decay, sexual desire, repression and death. Dialogue throughout is often written using nonstandard spelling intended to represent accents of the Southern United States. The original production starred Barbara Bel Geddes, Burl Ives and Ben Gazzara. The play was adapted as a motion picture of the same name in 1958, starring Elizabeth Taylor and Paul Newman as Maggie and Brick, with Burl Ives and Madeleine Sherwood recreating their stage roles. Williams made substantial excisions and alterations to the play for a revival in 1974. This has been the version used for most subsequent revivals, which have been numerous.

Plot

A family in the American South is in crisis, especially the husband Brick and wife Margaret (usually called Maggie or "Maggie the Cat"), and their interaction with Brick's family over the course of one evening's gathering at the family estate in Mississippi. The party celebrates the birthday of patriarch Big Daddy Pollitt, "the Delta's biggest cotton-planter", and his return from the Ochsner Clinic with what he has been told is a clean bill of health. All family members (except Big Daddy and his wife Big Mama) are aware of Big Daddy's true diagnosis: He is dying of cancer. His family has lied to Big Daddy and Big Mama to spare the aging couple from pain on the patriarch's birthday, but throughout the course of the play, it becomes clear that the Pollitt family has long constructed a web of deceit for itself.

Maggie, determined and beautiful, has escaped a childhood of poverty to marry into the wealthy Pollitts, but finds herself unfulfilled. The family is aware that Brick has not slept with Maggie for a long time, which has strained their marriage. Brick, an aging football hero, infuriates her by ignoring his brother Gooper's attempts to gain control of the family fortune. Brick's indifference and his drinking have escalated with the suicide of his friend Skipper. Maggie fears that Brick's malaise will ensure that Gooper and his wife Mae inherit Big Daddy's estate.

Through the evening, Brick, Big Daddy, Maggie, and the entire family separately must face the issues which they have bottled up inside. Big Daddy attempts a reconciliation with the alcoholic Brick. Both Big Daddy and Maggie separately confront Brick about the true nature of his relationship with his football buddy Skipper, which appears to be the source of Brick's sorrow and the cause of his alcoholism.

Brick explains to Big Daddy that Maggie was jealous of the close friendship between Brick and Skipper, and she believed it had a romantic undercurrent. He states that Skipper took Maggie to bed to prove her wrong. Brick believes that when Skipper could not complete the act, his self-questioning about his sexuality and his friendship with Brick made him "snap". Brick reveals that Skipper, shortly before committing suicide, confessed his feelings to Brick, but Brick rejected him.
 
Disgusted with the family's mendacity, Brick tells Big Daddy that the report from the clinic about his condition was falsified for his sake. Big Daddy storms out of the room, leading the party gathered outside to drift inside. Maggie, Brick, Mae, Gooper, and Doc Baugh (the family's physician) decide to tell Big Mama the truth about her husband's illness, and she is devastated by the news. Gooper and Mae start to discuss the division of the Pollitt estate. Big Mama defends her husband from Gooper and Mae's proposals.

Big Daddy reappears and makes known his plans to die peacefully. Attempting to secure Brick's inheritance, Maggie tells him she is pregnant. Gooper and Mae know this is a lie, but Big Mama and Big Daddy believe that Maggie "has life". When they are alone again, Maggie locks away the liquor and promises Brick that she will "make the lie true".

Themes

Falsehoods and untruths
Mendacity is a recurring theme throughout the play. Brick uses the word to express his disgust with the "lies and liars" he sees around him, and with complicated rules of social conduct in Southern society and culture. Big Daddy states that Brick's disgust with mendacity is really disgust with himself for rejecting Skipper before his suicide. With the exception of Brick, the entire family lies to Big Daddy and Big Mama about his terminal cancer. Furthermore, Big Daddy lies to his wife, and Gooper and Mae exhibit avaricious motives in their attempt to secure Big Daddy's estate.

In some cases, characters refuse to believe certain statements, leading them to believe they are lies. A recurring phrase is the line, "Wouldn't it be funny if that was true?", said by both Big Daddy and Brick after Big Mama and Maggie (respectively) exclaim their love. The characters' statements of feeling are no longer clear-cut truths or lies; instead they become subject more to certainty or uncertainty. This phrase is the last line of the play as originally written by Williams and again in the 1974 version.

Facing death
The ways in which humans deal with death are also at the focus of this play, as are the futility and nihilism some encounter when confronted with imminent mortality. Similar ideas are found in Dylan Thomas's "Do Not Go Gentle into That Good Night", which Williams excerpted and added as an epigraph to his 1974 version. These lines are appropriate, as Thomas wrote the poem to his own dying father.

Additionally, in one of his many drafts, in a footnote on Big Daddy's action in the third act, Williams deems Cat on a Hot Tin Roof a "play which says only one affirmative thing about 'Man's Fate': that he has it still in his power not to squeal like a pig but to keep a tight mouth about it."

Stage productions

Original production
The original Broadway production, which opened at the Morosco Theater on March 24, 1955, was directed by Elia Kazan and starred Barbara Bel Geddes as Maggie, Ben Gazzara as Brick, Burl Ives as Big Daddy, Mildred Dunnock as Big Mama, Pat Hingle as Gooper, and Madeleine Sherwood as Mae. Bel Geddes was the only cast member nominated for a Tony Award, and Kazan was nominated for Best Director of a Play. Kazan had enormous power in the industry at the time, sufficient to convince Williams to rewrite the third act to Kazan's liking. Kazan requested that Maggie be shown as more sympathetic, the dying Big Daddy to make a reappearance, and Brick to undergo some sort of moral awakening. Williams capitulated, but when the play was published later that year by New Directions Publishing, it included two versions of act three, Williams' original and the Broadway revision, with his accompanying "Note of Explanation". For its 1974 revival, Williams made further revisions to all three acts, and New Directions published that version of the play in 1975. 

Both Ives and Sherwood would reprise their roles in the 1958 film version. The cast also featured the southern blues duo Brownie McGhee and Sonny Terry and had as Gazzara's understudy the young Cliff Robertson. When Gazzara left the play, Jack Lord replaced him. Others from the original Broadway production included R.G. Armstrong as Doctor Baugh, Fred Stewart as Reverend Tooker, Janice Dunn as Trixie, Seth Edwards as Sonny, Maxwell Glanville as Lacey, Pauline Hahn as Dixie, Darryl Richard as Buster, Eva Vaughn Smith as Daisy, and Musa Williams as Sookey.

In London, the play was directed by Peter Hall and opened at the Comedy Theatre on January 30, 1958. Kim Stanley starred as Maggie, with Paul Massie as Brick and Leo McKern as Big Daddy.

Revivals
A 1974 revival by the American Shakespeare Theatre in Stratford, Connecticut, featured Elizabeth Ashley, Keir Dullea, Fred Gwynne, Kate Reid, and Charles Siebert. Ashley was nominated for a Tony Award. For this production, Williams restored much of the text which he had removed from the original one at the insistence of Elia Kazan. He included a revised third act and made substantial revisions elsewhere. According to Ashley, Williams allowed the actors to examine his original notes and various drafts of the script, and to make additions to the dialogue. When this production moved from Connecticut to Broadway, the part of Lacey was omitted and the number of Mae and Gooper's children reduced to three. In that same decade, John Carradine and Mercedes McCambridge toured in a road company production as Big Daddy and Big Mama.

The 1988 London National Theatre production, directed by Howard Davies, starred Ian Charleson, Lindsay Duncan, Barbara Leigh-Hunt, and Eric Porter.

A revival in 1990 featured Kathleen Turner, who was nominated for a Tony for her performance as Maggie, though New York magazine called her "hopelessly lost ... in this limp production." Charles Durning, as Big Daddy, received a Tony Award for Best Featured Actor in a Play. Daniel Hugh Kelly was Brick, and Polly Holliday was Big Mama. Holliday also was nominated for a Tony.

A 2001 production at the Lyric Shaftesbury, London, was the first West End revival since 1958. Produced by Anthony Page, the production featured Brendan Fraser as Brick, Frances O'Connor as Maggie, Ned Beatty as Big Daddy and Gemma Jones as Big Mamma. Reviews were generally positive.

A 2003 revival received lukewarm reviews despite the presence of film stars Ashley Judd and Jason Patric. Only Ned Beatty as Big Daddy and Margo Martindale as Big Mama were singled out for impressive performances. Martindale received a Tony nomination.

A 2003 revival for Belvoir St Theatre was directed by Simon Stone and starred Jacqueline McKenzie as Maggie, Ewen Leslie as Brick, and Marshall Napier as Big Daddy. This production was a box office hit, with season extended to the Theatre Royal (Sydney).

A 2004 production at the Kennedy Center featured Mary Stuart Masterson as Maggie, Jeremy Davidson as Brick, George Grizzard as Big Daddy, Dana Ivey as Big Mama, and Emily Skinner as Mae. Shortly afterward, Masterson and Davidson were married.

In 2008, an all-black production directed by Debbie Allen opened on Broadway. Terrence Howard made his Broadway debut as Brick, with James Earl Jones as Big Daddy, Phylicia Rashad as Big Mama, Anika Noni Rose as Maggie and Lisa Arrindell Anderson as Mae. In November 2009, the production moved to London's West End, where Adrian Lester played Brick and Sanaa Lathan played Maggie. The West End Production received the 2010 Laurence Olivier Award for Best Revival of a Play.

In 2010, a production of the play opened at Cambridge University's ADC Theatre, and in January 2011, a production to mark Williams' 100th birthday was presented at Vienna's English Theatre, Vienna, Austria. The play was performed at the Shaw Festival in Niagara-on-the-Lake, Canada in 2011 starring Maya O’Connell as Maggie and Gray Powell as Brick and in 2012 at the Guthrie Theater in Minneapolis.

A 2013 Broadway revival featured Ciarán Hinds as Big Daddy, Debra Monk as Big Mama, Benjamin Walker as Brick, George Porteous as Sonny, and Scarlett Johansson as Maggie.

A 2014 production played at Royal & Derngate, Royal Exchange Theatre and Northern Stage, with original music by White Lies. It featured Mariah Gale, Charles Aitken, Daragh O'Malley and Kim Criswell and was directed by James Dacre. In this production, O'Malley was singled out for his performance and won an MTA Award and Stage Nomination for his portrayal of Big Daddy.

The Berkshire Theatre Festival produced the play in June, 2016, under the direction of David Auburn, with Michael Raymond-James as Brick, Rebecca Brooksher as Maggie, Linda Gehringer as Big Mama, and Jim Beaver as Big Daddy.

The Young Vic's 2018 production, directed by Benedict Andrews, and starring Sienna Miller as Maggie, Jack O'Connell as Brick, Colm Meaney as Big Daddy, Lisa Palfrey as Big Mama, Hayley Squires as Mae, Brian Gleeson as Gooper, Richard Hansell as Doctor, and Michael J. Shannon as Reverend, was filmed at the Apollo Theatre for National Theatre Live.   On March 10, 2021, the filmed production was added the National Theatre Live's streaming service: National Theatre At Home.

Notable casts

Adaptations

The big-screen adaptation of the play was released by MGM in 1958 and starred Elizabeth Taylor, Paul Newman, Judith Anderson, and Jack Carson, with Burl Ives and Madeleine Sherwood reprising their stage roles. Critics said that the film censors and directors diminished the motion picture's authenticity. The Hays Code limited Brick's portrayal of sexual desire for Skipper, and diminished the original play's critique of homophobia and sexism.  According to critic Emanuel Levy, George Cukor was initially assigned to direct the film, "though issues of censorship— homosexuality in particular— prevented him from doing it". Director Richard Brooks’ version was criticized for toning down the play, specifically eliminating the homosexual theme. The film substituted a hazy image of hero-worship rather than Tennessee Williams' strong suggestion of homosexuality. Williams reportedly was unhappy with the screenplay, which removed almost all of the homosexual themes and revised the third act section to include a lengthy scene of reconciliation between Brick and Big Daddy. Paul Newman, the film's star, also had stated his disappointment with the adaptation. Despite this, the film was highly acclaimed and was nominated for several Academy Awards, including Best Picture. Elizabeth Taylor and Paul Newman both received Oscar nominations for their performances.

In 1976, a television version of Cat on a Hot Tin Roof was produced, starring the then husband-and-wife team of Natalie Wood and Robert Wagner, and featuring Laurence Olivier as Big Daddy and Maureen Stapleton as Big Mama.

In 1984 a television version was produced by American Playhouse, starring Jessica Lange, Tommy Lee Jones, Rip Torn, Kim Stanley, David Dukes, and Penny Fuller. This adaptation, directed by Jack Hofsiss, revived the sexual innuendos which had been muted in the 1958 film. Both Stanley and Fuller were nominated for the Emmy Award for Outstanding Supporting Actress in a Miniseries or Special, and Stanley won.

The 2016 Bollywood movie Kapoor & Sons also drew its inspiration from the play.

A new film adaptation was announced in 2021, with Antoine Fuqua directing and producing. The producers of the 2008 Broadway revival, Stephen C. Byrd and Alia Jones-Harvey, will also produce.

Awards and nominations

Original Broadway production

1974 Broadway revival

1990 Broadway revival

2003 Broadway revival

2008 Broadway revival

See also

References
Informational notes

Citations

Further reading
 Bloom, Harold (ed.). Tennessee Williams, Modern Critical Views, 80. New York: Chelsea House, 1987.
 Cañadas, Ivan. "The Naming of Straw and Ochello in Tennessee Williams's Cat On a Hot Tin Roof, English Language Notes 42.4 (June 2005): 57–62.
 Clum, John M. "Something Cloudy, Something Clear': Homophobic Discourse in Tennessee Williams, South Atlantic Quarterly 88.1 (Winter 1989): 161–79.
 The National, indie rock band. "City Middle" from the record Alligator: "I think I'm like Tennessee Williams, I wait for the click; I wait, but it doesn't kick in."
 Plooster, Nancy. "Silent Partners: Lost Lovers in American Drama". 1995 Queer Frontiers: Proceedings of the Fifth Annual National Lesbian, Gay and Bisexual Graduate Student Conference. University of Southern California. March 23–26, 1995, Ed. John Waiblinger. University of Southern California Library. USC.edu
 Shackelford, Dean. "The Truth That Must Be Told: Gay Subjectivity, Homophobia, and Social History in Cat on a Hot Tin Roof. Tennessee Williams Annual Review 1 (1998): 103–118.
 
 Stanton, Stephen S. (Ed.). Tennessee Williams: A Collection of Critical Essays. Englewood Cliffs, NJ: Prentice-Hall, 1977.
 Winchell, Mark Royden. "Come Back to the Locker Room Ag'in, Brick Honey!". Mississippi Quarterly: The Journal of Southern Culture. 48:4 (Fall 1995): 701–12.

External links

 
 
 Cat on a Hot Tin Roof study guide, themes, quotes, character analyses, teaching guide

1955 plays
American plays adapted into films
Broadway plays
LGBT-related plays
Plays by Tennessee Williams
Plays set in Mississippi
Pulitzer Prize for Drama-winning works
New Directions Publishing books